In geometry, the positive and negative Voronoi poles of a cell in a Voronoi diagram are certain vertices of the diagram.

Definition

Let  be the Voronoi diagram for a set of sites , and let  be the Voronoi cell of  corresponding to a site . If  is bounded, then its positive pole is the vertex of the boundary of  that has maximal distance to the point . If the cell is unbounded, then a positive pole is not defined.

References

 

Computational geometry